The enzyme threonine synthase (EC 4.2.3.1) catalyzes the chemical reaction
 
O-phospho-L-homoserine + H2O  L-threonine + phosphate

This enzyme belongs to the family of lyases, specifically those carbon-oxygen lyases acting on phosphates. The systematic name of this enzyme class is O-phospho-L-homoserine phosphate-lyase (adding water L-threonine-forming). Other names in common use include threonine synthetase, and ''O''-phospho-L-homoserine phospho-lyase (adding water). This enzyme participates in glycine, serine and threonine metabolism, and vitamin B6 metabolism. It employs one cofactor, pyridoxal phosphate.

Structural studies

References

 

EC 4.2.3
Pyridoxal phosphate enzymes
Enzymes of known structure